Ashley Morris may refer to:

 Ashley Morris (blogger) (1963–2008), New Orleans cultural and political blogger, professor of computer science
 Ashley Austin Morris (born 1983), American actress and comedian 
 Ashley Morris (speedway rider) (born 1994), British speedway rider
 Ashley Diana Morris (born 1988), Canadian model and actress
 Ashley Morris, chief executive officer Capriotti's